The 2007 All-Ireland Minor Football Championship was the 76th staging of the All-Ireland Minor Football Championship, the Gaelic Athletic Association's premier inter-county Gaelic football tournament for boys under the age of 18.

Roscommon entered the championship as defending champions, however, they were defeated by Laois in the All-Ireland quarter-final.

On 16 September 2007, Galway won the championship following a 1-10 to 1-9 defeat of Derry in the All-Ireland final. This was their sixth All-Ireland title overall and their first title in 21 championship seasons.

Results

Connacht Minor Football Championship
Rob Robin

Semi-Finals

Final

Leinster Minor Football Championship
Rob Robin

Quarter-Finals

Semi-Finals

Final

Munster Minor Football Championship
Rob Robin

Semi-Finals

Final

Ulster Minor Football Championship
Rob Robin

Quarter-Finals

Semi-Finals

Final

All-Ireland Minor Football Championship

Quarter-finals

Semi-finals

Final

References

2007
All-Ireland Minor Football Championship